Munger Road is a 2011 American independent horror film starring Bruce Davison.  It is based on the haunted namesake road located in the state of Illinois. The film was written and directed by St. Charles native, Nicholas Smith.

Plot
In St. Charles, IL, during the town's Scarecrow Fest, two teenaged couples (Joe, Corey, Scott and Rachel) take their SUV down to Munger Road to test the local urban legend. Simultaneously, a convicted killer escapes from his transport to another jail and starts a murder spree. Two police officers in town look to capture the killer without disturbing the town festival.

The teenagers, back at their vehicle, test to see if the children will push their SUV off the railroad track crossing by dusting the bumper with baby powder. The teenage girls are momentarily tricked by their boyfriends into believing that the spirits moved the vehicle. The girls become upset at being tricked and ask to go home. The boys try to start the vehicle, but are unable to do so. One of the couples decides to stay with the vehicle, while the other tries to walk to town for help.

The teens are slowly picked off by the escaped murderer while the police search to stop him.

Cast
Bruce Davison as Chief Kirkhoven
Randall Batinkoff as Deputy Hendricks
Trevor Morgan as Corey LaFayve
Brooke Peoples as Joe Risk
Hallock Beals as Scott Claussen
Lauren Storm as Rachel Donahue
Art Fox as Mayor Swanson
Maggie Henry as Nancy
Bill J. Stevens as Father McCroy
Ron Johnston as Lenny
Judy Proudfoot Schenck as Judy

Production
The film was shot in the Illinois cities of Bartlett, St. Charles, Elburn, Geneva and Sugar Grove.

Reception
Roger Ebert awarded the film three stars.  Brad McHargue of Dread Central criticized the ending of the film.

References

External links
 
 
 

American independent films
American horror films
Films shot in Illinois
2010s English-language films
2010s American films